Sten Gustav Axelsson Elfström (born 18 August 1942 in Solna, Sweden) is a Swedish actor. He was educated at Gothenburg Theatre Academy.

Selected filmography
2015 – Avicii - Waiting For Love (music video)
2012 – Real Humans (TV)
2010 – Sound of Noise
2010 – Tusen gånger starkare
2010 – Psalm 21
2009 – Morden
2009 – Kenny Begins
2008 – Kungamordet (TV)
2008 – The King of Ping Pong
2007 – Den man älskar
2007 – Hotell Kantarell (TV)
2006 – Brandvägg (TV)
2006 – Kronprinsessan (TV)
2003 – En utflykt till månens baksida
2003 – Håkan Bråkan (TV)
2002 – Beck – Annonsmannen
2000 – Soldater i månsken (TV)
1998 – Skärgårdsdoktorn (TV)
1997 – Kenny Starfighter (TV)
1995 – Snoken (TV)
1990 – Ebba & Didrik (TV)
1983 – Profitörerna (TV)
1980 – Lycka till (TV)

External links
http://www.sfi.se/sv/svensk-filmdatabas/Item/?type=PERSON&itemid=176684

1942 births
20th-century Swedish male actors
21st-century Swedish male actors
Living people
People from Solna Municipality
Swedish male film actors
Swedish male television actors